Instrumentation Laboratory may refer to:

 The Charles Stark Draper Laboratory, formerly the MIT Instrumentation Laboratory
 Instrumentation Laboratories (SUPARCO), a division of the Space and Upper Atmosphere Research Commission (SUPARCO) also known as the Pakistan Space Agency